George Davis Begole (May 28, 1877 – December 22, 1956) was an American politician who served as the mayor of Denver, Colorado from 1931 to 1935.

References

Mayors of Denver
1877 births
1956 deaths